The River Ness (Scottish Gaelic: Abhainn Nis) is a river in Highland, Scotland, UK.

Etymology 
The hydronym Ness is of Pictish origin. The name may be derived from *Nessa, the name of a river goddess. *Nessa preserves an Old Celtic *Nesta, with roots in Indo-European ned, "water", from which the Greek hydronyms Neda and Nestos are descended.

Course
Dochgarroch weir at the downstream end of Loch Dochfour delineates the start of the River Ness. The Bathymetrical survey of the Scottish fresh-water lochs considered Loch Dochfour to be distinct from Loch Ness proper, but capable of being regarded as forming part of Loch Ness. At Carnarc Point on the west bank the river discharges into the eastern end of the Beauly Firth, which is a continuation of the Moray Firth, at Kessock. The northern section of the Caledonian Canal passes partly through the River Ness and partly alongside it. The river Ness is of glacial origin.

Ness catchment
Although the River Ness starts at Dochgarroch weir at the downstream end of Loch Dochfour, it is supplied by Loch Ness, and so all the rivers flowing into Loch Ness are part of the River Ness catchment area:
River Ness
River Farigaig (R) (flows into Loch Ness)
River Enrick (L) (flows into Loch Ness)
River Coiltie (L) (flows into Loch Ness)
River Foyers (R) (flows into Loch Ness)
River Fechlin (L)
Allt Breineag (L)
River E (L) (flows into Loch Mhòr)
River Moriston (L) (flows into Loch Ness)
Allt Bhlaraidh (L)
River Doe (L)
River Loyne (R)
Allt Doe (R) (flows into Loch Ness)
River Tarff (R) (flows into Loch Ness)
River Oich (links Loch Oich to head of Loch Ness at Fort Augustus)
River Garry, Inverness-shire (flows into Loch Oich)
The linear River Ness-Loch Ness-Loch Oich axis follows the Great Glen Fault, with the watershed being in a low depression at Laggan Locks, beyond which Loch Lochy-River Lochy-River Spean continue on this axis to the west coast at Fort William.

Notable buildings

On a hill above the river in Inverness stands Inverness Castle. Next to the castle is the Inverness Museum and Art Gallery. The river is overlooked by the Eden Court Theatre, one of the largest theatres in Scotland. Inverness Cathedral also lies on the banks of the River Ness as does Old High St Stephen's, which stands on a hill known as St Michael's Mount. Inverness draws many tourists and there are hotels along the river.

Bridges
There are several bridges in Inverness which cross the River Ness: the Ness Islands bridges; the Infirmary Bridge, built at Rose Street Foundry, Inverness 1879; Ness Bridge, constructed in 1961 replacing an earlier bridge which itself replaced a bridge of 1685 which collapsed during flooding in 1849. The 1685 bridge was sketched by J. M. W. Turner in 1831 and the sketch belongs to the Tate; Greig Street Bridge; Friar's Bridge; Waterloo Bridge; and the Railway Bridge, which is a steel bridge fabricated in 1989 to replace the earlier stone bridge which was swept away in floods in 1989. The Greig Street Bridge is a picturesque suspension bridge built in Inverness in 1881. The Inverness southern bypass was completed in 2017 with Holm Mills Bridge across the river.

Nature and parks

Upstream of Inverness city centre lie the Ness Islands which are popular for nature walks and have many fine tree specimens. The river flows through the heart of the City of Inverness, and fishermen in waders can often be seen casting for salmon. The Ness District Salmon Fishery Board is the statutory body responsible for the protection and enhancement of salmon and sea trout fisheries in the Ness District. Common seals and grey seals are often seen, as are grey heron, pipistrelle and Daubenton's bats, housemartins, grey wagtail, great black backed gull, European herring gull, oystercatchers, mallards, dippers, goosander and other diving birds. At certain times of the year Arctic terns can be seen lining the railings along the river banks and rarely eagle owl have been seen and the occasional osprey has been spotted fishing in the river from the Ness Islands. European otter are sometimes spotted. The banks of the river are lined with lime trees.

Near the Ness Islands on the west bank is Bught Park which has facilities for sports and leisure. Here can be found Inverness Sports Centre and Aquadome, the ice rink and Inverness Botanic Gardens formerly known as the Floral Hall and Gardens containing tropical and desert glasshouses and a water cascade. Further upstream from Bught Park is Whin Park which has a boating pond.

In Cavell Gardens near the Infirmary Bridge is Inverness war memorial which commemorates the fallen of the two world wars. The memorial is made of red sandstone and is designed in the form of a Celtic cross.

Flood alleviation
A major flood alleviation scheme is currently under construction in the city centre side of the river. The £8.5 million contract for this phase is being undertaken by Morgan Sindall.

The Port of Inverness

The Port of Inverness is situated at the mouth of the River Ness where there is also a recently constructed marina offering mooring for private yachts and other vessels.

Miscellanea

The first claimed sighting of the Loch Ness Monster was in the River Ness in AD 565, when Saint Columba is said to have banished a "water monster" back into the river after it tried to attack one of his disciples who was swimming across the river.

According to Adomnán, when Columba visited King Bridei I of Pictland at his house on the River Ness, he met a wizard named Broichan who had an Irish slave-girl that he refused to release even though Columba pleaded with him. Columba went out of Bridei's house and picked up a white pebble from the river. He said that the pebble would be used to heal many sick people in Pictland, and that Broichan was suffering for his sins at that very moment. After he had finished speaking, two messengers came to tell them that Broichan had a seizure and they wanted Columba to help them. Columba gave them the stone and said to dip it in water to give to Broichan, if he agreed to release the slave-girl. He agreed to do so, and the stone was put in water and it floated on it; the wizard drank from the water and was healed. This stone was kept by King Bridei in the royal treasury for the rest of his life, and anyone who came there for healing would be given water with the stone floating in it, and they would be healed.

See also
Rivers of Scotland

References

 
Geography of Inverness
Ness
Ness
 
Loch Ness